Ulster flag is the flag of Ulster, one of the four provinces of Ireland.

Ulster flag may also refer to:

 The Ulster Banner, the flag of the Government of Northern Ireland, and de facto flag of Northern Ireland, from 1953 to 1972
 The other flags used in Northern Ireland